The following is a list of recurring Saturday Night Live characters and sketches introduced between September 25, 2010, and May 21, 2011, the thirty-sixth season of SNL.

The Miley Cyrus Show
Vanessa Bayer plays teen Disney Channel star Miley Cyrus as the exuberant host of her own talk show. (Theme song: "I've got guests, and a show, and I'm ready to go! So I guess that's pretty cool! It's pretty cool!") Bryan Cranston played her father and house band leader Billy Ray Cyrus in the sketch's debut; he was replaced by Jason Sudeikis in later installments.

Bayer performed her impression of Cyrus during her auditions for SNL. She said in a 2011 interview that when fans recognize her, Cyrus is the character they most often mention.

Cyrus asking her guests extremely long, compounded questions is a recurring element of the sketch. (For example, to Katie Holmes (Anne Hathaway): "Like, how did you transition into doing more adult roles, and, like, what's the sexiest role you've ever done, and, like, how many boys have you kissed on screen, and, like, who's your best friend, and, like, who's Tom Cruise's best friend, and why does your baby wear high heels, and what does Jesus think of Scientology?") According to Bayer, the questions tend to change throughout the process from writing through rehearsal to the live performance. "That run is one of those things that is always changing up until the show. We'll take out one of the questions that didn't get a laugh and put a new one in."

Bayer and Cyrus first met in person when Cyrus hosted the March 5, 2011, episode of SNL. Cyrus described their meeting:I said, "You play me on TV!" And she said, "Yeah, I do." And I was like, "Oh, well that’s pretty cool." And she goes, "What?" And I was like, "Oh my God, I sound like you doing me!" 

Appearances

Les Jeunes de Paris
A French TV series about angry teens who break into dance to express their emotions and act out melodramatic plotlines. Taran Killam stars as François.

Killam co-wrote the first version of the sketch while working with The Groundlings, after being inspired by the Camille song "Ta Douleur": "We just were looking for a reason to dance around, really...It’s sort of just our exaggerated portrayal of our American interpretation of French youth culture, inspired by the song." He credits Emma Stone's support for making the sketch Killam's first written work to be performed on SNL.

SNL writer Rob Klein helped Killam with the "structure" needed to make "Les Jeunes de Paris" a recurring sketch. Following its second appearance, Killam said:The action of the sketch is whatever the tone of the song I chose inspires. "Tékitoi?"  [the Rachid Taha song used in the second sketch] has got some of that combative energy because of the two voices going back and forth, so I wanted to involve some sort of love triangle in the plot. But it just becomes about how many times people can throw water in my face. It’s just really fun to do, to get as much of the cast involved to jump around and look like idiots.

Appearances

"Sex" Ed Vincent
Paul Brittain plays a creepy sex ed teacher.

Appearances

Laura Parsons
Vanessa Bayer plays impassioned child actress Laura Parsons, who may have more energy and volume than actual talent.

The Essentials with Robert Osborne
As the Turner Classic Movies host Robert Osborne, Jason Sudeikis introduces "a look back" at classic and not-so-classic films.

Appearances

Visiting the Queen
Fred Armisen and Bill Hader play Queen Elizabeth and Prince Philip, and reveal themselves in private to be rude, nasty bullies with Cockney accents.

Appearances

Herb Welch
Bill Hader plays an elderly, cantankerous news reporter who spews prejudice and insults while hitting his interview subjects in the face with his microphone. Nasim Pedrad and Jason Sudeikis play anchors Wanda Ramirez and Jack Rizzoli, while the episode's host appears as one of Welch's interviewees. Towards the end of each installment, Rizzoli announces to viewers that Welch has died; when they cut back to Welch, he's suddenly revived.

The Herb Welch character has been interpreted as a satirical take on former Good Day New York reporter Dick Oliver. However, Hader has said the character stemmed from a sketch with Emma Stone where he played a different reporter, Peter de Santos; during rehearsal, he "kept pretending to hit Kristen and Emma in the face with a microphone. And that's how we came up with Herb Welch. So we wrote Herb Welch into it the next week."

Appearances

Julian Assange
Bill Hader parodies WikiLeaks founder Julian Assange.

The Julian Assange sketches were written by Seth Meyers and Christine Nangle. Nangle said in an interview that the sketches "were super fun to work on, because we were allowed to play with it. Like, we would start other sketches and interrupt them with Julian Assange ... it was fun to mix up what the normal SNL way of doing things is."

Appearances

Principal Daniel Frye
Daniel Frye (Jay Pharoah) is the wheezing, frustrated, stuttering, fast-speaking high school principal of Booker T. Washington High School who makes announcements during school dances and events where he starts off his announcements by quoting "Attention teachers and students." The announcements would revolve around the various antics that are happening at the school dances and events. Principal Frye refers to the mischievous students as "Jive Time Turkeys" and also insert the words "our beloved" before the name of the staff member (with their occupation being said before the staff member's name) when talking about what had happened to them. Other characters that appear in this sketch include the unnamed vice-principal (Vanessa Bayer) who opens up the dance and/or event announcements and the gym teacher Mr. Steve Kane (Kenan Thompson) who keeps the students in line when they start booing at the speaker (played by the Host).

He is based on Jay Pharoah's former principal Jimmy Frye at Indian River High School in Virginia who had the similar mannerism.

Appearances

What's That Name?
A game show hosted by Vince Blight (Bill Hader).

Merryville Carnival Ride
A couple is enjoying a carnival ride featuring singing animatronic robots (played by the host, Taran Killam, and Bill Hader), when the ride suddenly breaks down. As the couple waits to start moving again (with updates from a repairman (Bobby Moynihan)), the robots continue to repeat their routine; however, one of the riders notices that the routine is changing so as to imply an ominous threat to the couple.

Appearances

Triangle Sally
Kristen Wiig portrays a 1980s-era "musician" whose act consists entirely of dancing and occasionally tapping a triangle.

Appearances

Triangle Sally also appeared in an installment of The Original Kings of Catchphrase Comedy that was scheduled to air on May 19, 2012, as part of Wiig's final episode as an SNL cast member. The sketch was cut from the episode before airing, but was released online.

Jacob the Bar Mitzvah Boy
13-year-old Jacob (Vanessa Bayer) was introduced in a sketch featuring his bar mitzvah, which his father (Fred Armisen) had insisted on turning into a star-studded extravaganza despite Jacob's protests that a "modest luncheon" would have been fine.

Jacob has subsequently been featured on Weekend Update, to tell the stories of Hanukkah and Passover. In each of these appearances, he reads from a prepared speech peppered with corny jokes (usually repeating a punchline on a later joke, even if it doesn't make sense); after each joke, he looks up at the audience with a grin. When Seth Meyers or Michael Che tells him he doesn't need to read from a script, or tries to engage him in dialogue, Jacob just smiles and then resumes his speech. Jacob is also incredibly shy when talking to Cecily Strong and most likely girls in general.

Bayer had told one of the SNL writers about the Jacob character, which she had originated in her stand-up, but didn't write the first bar mitzvah sketch herself. About the character, she said: "When I was in seventh grade, we had bar and bat mitzvahs every weekend, so I had a lot of experience with that kind of boy. I was bat mitzvahed, and there were so many awkward boys running around."

Jacob wears a yarmulke with the New York Yankees logo and is a devoted Yankees fan.

Appearances

The Original Kings of Catchphrase Comedy
A parody of The Original Kings of Comedy, showcasing hacky stand-up comedians who rely on strange catchphrases, gestures, and nicknames for a laugh, in the same vein as Jeff Foxworthy, Larry the Cable Guy and Bill Engvall.

According to SNL writer Christine Nangle, the Kings of Catchphrase Comedy sketches "are so fun, because the whole cast gets involved and you give them a catchphrase and then they improvise – some of them improvise their own catchphrases. And you just get to see everybody come through that day – because it takes a while to film it all – and just kind of be hilarious. You just kind of let them go and you're reminded of how talented our cast really is."

Appearances

An installment of the sketch was scheduled to air on May 19, 2012, but was cut. It was later released online.

Get in the Cage!
Actor Nicolas Cage (Andy Samberg) sits down with a fellow thespian (appearing as himself) to discuss their craft. However, the only question Cage ever seems to ask is why he doesn't appear in a movie that his interviewee is trying to promote.  In a re-occurring gag and catch phrase, in each sketch, the interviewee will insult Cage, and after a brief thinking pause, Samberg (as Cage) will misinterpret the insult as a compliment, exclaiming, "That's high praise!"  In the interview where Nicolas Cage interviewed Nicolas Cage, the real Cage delivered the "That's high praise!" line.

Appearances

The Best of Both Worlds
As Hugh Jackman, Andy Samberg hosts a talk show for actors whose roles portray radically different sides of their personality. Bobby Moynihan plays the stage manager, Richie.

Appearances

Bongo's Clown Room
Jason Sudeikis plays MC Tommy, the host of a seedy strip club.

Appearances

Dictator's Two Best Friends From Growing Up
Bayer and Armisen appear on Weekend Update to discuss the many great qualities of their friend (a ruthless dictator), while going into hushed asides about his breaches of etiquette.

Appearances

References

Lists of recurring Saturday Night Live characters and sketches
Saturday Night Live in the 2010s
Saturday Night Live
Saturday Night Live